Noel Butlin AC (19 December 1921 - 2 April 1991) was a distinguished Australian economic historian, considered "one of the most outstanding Australian social scientists of his generation, and one of the major international figures in economic history." He was long associated with the Australian National University, the library of which has an archives centre that bears his name. His brother was Sydney James Butlin.

He became a Fellow of the Australian Academy of Social Sciences from 1956 and a corresponding fellow of the British Academy from 1976. The Economic History Society of Australia and New Zealand hold an annual lecture in his name.

Butlin was appointed Companion of the Order of Australia in 1992.

References

1921 births
1991 deaths
Economic historians
20th-century Australian historians
Academic staff of the Australian National University
Fellows of the Academy of the Social Sciences in Australia
Companions of the Order of Australia